Ridley Bent is the stage name of Brian Daniel Fowler, a Canadian country singer-songwriter. Born in Halifax, Nova Scotia, Bent was raised throughout Canada in a military family. He formally launched his musical career in 2000 in British Columbia, including performances as an opening act for Great Big Sea and Sam Roberts.

His debut album, Blam!, was released on MapleMusic Recordings in 2005, and was marked by a style that incorporated country, rock and hip hop influences, in a manner similar to Buck 65. The album was produced by Chin Injeti, formerly of the R&B band Bass is Base. Described by Bent as "hick hop", the album was best known for the single "Suicidewinder".

His subsequent albums, 2007's Buckles and Boots and 2010's Rabbit on My Wheel, pursued a more conventional country sound.

In early 2009, Bent's song "Nine Inch Nails" won in the 8th Annual Independent Music Awards and Vox Pop vote for Best Country Song.

More recently he has toured and recorded with a new backing band, the Killer Tumbleweeds. His first album with that band, Ridley Bent and the Killer Tumbleweeds, was released in 2018.

Discography

Albums

Singles

Music videos

Awards and nominations

References

External links

Canadian country singer-songwriters
Canadian rock singers
Canadian male singer-songwriters
Canadian people of British descent
1979 births
Living people
Musicians from Halifax, Nova Scotia
Open Road Recordings artists
Canadian alternative country singers
Independent Music Awards winners
MapleMusic Recordings artists
21st-century Canadian male singers